Oakdale Rugby Football Club is a rugby union team from the village of Oakdale near Blackwood in Wales. The club is a member of the Welsh Rugby Union, and is a feeder club for the Newport Gwent Dragons.

Club honours
 WRU Division Five East 2009/10 - Champions
 WRU Bowl 2018-19 - Runners-Up

External links
 Oakdale RFC

References

Welsh rugby union teams